Tephritis cincta is a species of tephritid or fruit flies in the genus Campiglossa of the family Tephritidae.

Distribution
Denmark, Germany.

References

Tephritinae
Insects described in 1844
Diptera of Europe